Little Cedar can mean either of the following places:

Little Cedar Lake, a lake in the Canadian province of Quebec
Little Cedar, Iowa, a community in the United States